"Echo" is the first single from the Multicultural Australian singer Mileo. The song was released on 11 February 2014 "Echo" is written and produced by Mileo and Thomas Eriksen. It has influences of EDM & world.

Composition
"Echo", is a dance-pop track with elements of world as well as electronica, The song has an atmospheric dance-pop production, filled with dreamy synths, ethnic influences and pulverising beat breakdowns  Mileo stated that "Echo" is about a relationship that could have been but wasn't, it's not a sad song, but that's whats so great about music, people can interpret and relate to it anyway they want"

Track listings

Release history

Chart performance

Weekly charts

References

2014 songs
Synth-pop songs
Indietronica songs
Sony Music singles
Electronic songs